The New Price is Right can refer to the following incarnations of the television game show The Price Is Right:

 The Price Is Right (U.S. game show), which used the title from 1972-1973 on the daytime show and in print ads for the nighttime show until at least 1974
 The New Price Is Right (1994 game show), a short-lived syndicated version hosted by Doug Davidson
 The Price Is Right (Australian game show), which used the title during Ian Turpie's hosting run from 1981–1986
 The Price Is Right (UK game show), which used the title during Bob Warman's hosting run in 1989